Badminton at the 2018 Asian Games was held at Istora Gelora Bung Karno, Jakarta, Indonesia from 19 to 28 August. The badminton programme in 2018 included men's and women's singles competitions; men's, women's and mixed doubles competitions along with men's and women's team events.

Schedule

Medalists

Medal table

Participating nations
A total of 224 athletes from 19 nations competed in badminton at the 2018 Asian Games:

References

External links
Badminton at the 2018 Asian Games
Official Result Book – Badminton

 
2018
2018 Asian Games events
Asian Games
2018 Asian Games